Jamshid Sharmahd (born 23 March 1955) is an Iranian-German journalist and software engineer. He was born in Tehran and moved with his family to West Germany when he was seven years old. He has been a German citizen since 1995.

Sharmahd established his own software company and in 2003 moved to the United States, where he is a legal resident. In late July 2020, the Ministry of Intelligence of the Islamic Republic of Iran kidnapped Sharmahd in Dubai and was taken to Iran. The Iranian government alleges that Sharmahd is responsible for a 2008 attack on a mosque in Shiraz that killed 14 people and injured 200. He has also been accused of being a spy for Western Intelligence. His family deny all accusations. His abduction is one of a series of kidnappings carried out by the government of Iran.

Biography 

Jamshid Sharmahd was born in Tehran in 1955, and moved with his father to Hanover, West Germany, where he grew up in a German-Iranian household. He studied to become an electrician, and in 1980 briefly returned to Iran where he got married. In 1982, he returned to West Germany with his wife and daughter Gazelle Sharmahd. He has been living in California since 2003.

In 2007, a technical glitch exposed his contributions to the website of the dissident group Tondar publicly. This led to targeted harassment and assassination attempts against him by the Iranian government.

In July 2020, the Iranian regime kidnapped him during a stopover in Dubai, and took him to Iran where he has been held ever since. His family claimed that he was going to be executed. In February 2023, Iran announced Sharmahd would be sentenced to death. The following day, Germany announced it was expelling two Iranian diplomats.

See also 

 List of foreign nationals detained in Iran
 Extraordinary rendition

References 

1955 births
German people of Iranian descent
Iranian monarchists
Iranian emigrants to Germany
Iranian prisoners and detainees
Naturalized citizens of Germany
Prisoners and detainees of Iran
German people imprisoned abroad
Living people